Christian Hook (born 1971) is a Gibraltarian contemporary artist.

Hook was born in Gibraltar in 1971. He studied illustration at Middlesex University in the United Kingdom, and then worked as a part-time lecturer at the Royal College of Art in London.

In 2014 he won the Sky Arts Portrait Artist of the Year contest with a portrait of Alan Cumming. The painting was later chosen by John Leighton, director of the National Galleries of Scotland, as one of the best 100 paintings in its collection.

Hook has also painted Kristin Scott Thomas and Ian McKellen. He was awarded the Freedom of the City of Gibraltar in 2017.

In 2018, Hook released his ‘KI’ series, a collection of large-scale oil paintings inspired by his travels around Japan, focusing mainly on the ancient traditions of calligraphy and 'Chi'.

Hook was the keynote speaker at Althorp Literary Festival 2018.

Over the course of 2020 and 2021, Christian has been filming a Sky Arts documentary entitled 'Painting the Invisible'. The documentary will focus on Hook's new series of work which explores the concept of synaesthesia, and features several Nobel Prize winning scientists.

Christian Hook works as a full time artist, challenging himself to create paintings “depicting motion, time and the moments that occur between events.” With this unique idea, Christian has created paintings of celebrities, historical landmarks and horses.

Selected Major Commissions/Portraits
Hook has been commissioned by and produced portraits for figures such as Queen Elizabeth II, Sarah Ferguson, the Maharaja of Jodhpur, Sir Ian McKellen, Amir Khan, Mick Hucknall, Kristin Scott Thomas and Sue Johnson, among many others.

2020 - Portrait of Sir Richard Branson
2017 - 2 hour Live painting of Kristin Scott Thomas for cover of Financial Times ‘How to spend It magazine’ - Paris 
2017 - Live painting of ShiLai Liu, Chinese Entrepreneur
2016 - 2 hour live painting of the Maharaja of Jodhpur - India 
2016 - 2 hour live painting of Joan Bakewell for Sky Arts Awards 
2016 - 2 hour live painting of British Actor Simon Callow
2014 - Portrait of Amir Khan (world champion boxer), Bolton Museum, Permanent Collection
2014 - Portrait of Alan Cumming (Actor), Scottish National Portrait Gallery, Permanent Collection
2014 - Portrait of Sarah Ferguson (Duchess of York)
2014 - Portrait of Sir Ian McKellen

Awards
In the course of his career Hook has won several awards, including the Sky Arts Portrait Artist of the Year 2014 (in a presentation held at the National Portrait Gallery, London), and was awarded the Freedom of the City of Gibraltar in 2017. His artwork was chosen by Sir John Leighton from 100,000 works as one of the ‘100 Masterpieces’ from the collection of the National Galleries of Scotland, alongside pieces by Botticelli, Rembrandt and Matisse.

2017 - Awarded 'Freedom of the city Gibraltar' 
2015 - 'Honey Jar' - Portrait of Alan Cumming selected by Lord Leighton as one of the 100 masterpieces from the National Galleries of Scotland
2014 - Winner of Sky Arts Portrait Artist Of The Year – UK 
1991 - Kate Parker Life Drawing Award – London

Public Collections
Christian’s work is included in numerous significant public and private collections, including but not limited to:

Royal Collection
Scottish National Portrait Gallery
Bolton Museum
Museum of Liverpool
Gibraltar Museum

References

1971 births
Living people
British contemporary artists
Date of birth missing (living people)